WZAZ (1400 AM) is a silent radio station in Jacksonville, Florida which carries a Gospel music format.

History

The station was first licensed in 1950 as WRHC in Jacksonville, Florida. The call letters were changed to WERD on April 2, 1972, after this call sign was transferred from an earlier WERD in Atlanta, Georgia. On January 18, 1984 the call letters were changed to WZAZ.

References

External links
 
 FCC History Cards for WZAZ (covering 1949-1979 as WRHC & WERD) 

ZAZ
Gospel radio stations in the United States
ZAZ
Radio stations established in 1950